Callistoctopus is a genus of nocturnal, orange octopuses in the family Octopodidae. They are readily identifiable by their reddish coloring, the white papillae that line their bodies, and their long arms. Though sympatric with diurnal Octopus species, they avoid competition by hunting at night. In acknowledgement of this preference, many species of Callistoctopus are referred to as night octopuses. Well-known species include C. macropus (Atlantic white-spotted octopus) and the type species C. ornatus (ornate octopus), both of which are harvested for human consumption as seafood.

Species
 Callistoctopus alpheus (Norman, 1993) – Capricorn night octopus
 Callistoctopus aspilosomatis (Norman, 1993) – plainbody night octopus
 Callistoctopus bunurong (Stranks, 1990) – southern white-spot octopus
 Callistoctopus dierythraeus (Norman, 1992) – red-spot night octopus
 Callistoctopus graptus (Norman, 1992) – scribbled night octopus
 Callistoctopus kermadecensis (Berry, 1914)
 Callistoctopus lechenaultii (d'Orbigny, 1826)
 Callistoctopus luteus (Sasaki, 1929) – starry night octopus 
 Callistoctopus macropus (Risso, 1826) – Atlantic white-spotted octopus
 Callistoctopus nocturnus (Norman & Sweeney, 1997)
 Callistoctopus ornatus (Gould, 1852) – ornate octopus
 Callistoctopus rapanui (Voss, 1979)

Species brought into synonymy
 Callistoctopus arakawai (Taki, 1964): synonym of Callistoctopus ornatus (Gould, 1852)
 Callistoctopus magnocellatus (Taki, 1964): synonym of Octopus cyanea Gray, 1849
Taxa inquirenda
 Callistoctopus furvus (Gould, 1852): potential name for West Atlantic octopuses currently under C. macropus
 Callistoctopus taprobanensis (Robson, 1926)

External links

References

 Taki, I. (1964),  On eleven new species of the Cephalopoda from Japan, including two new genera of the Octopodinae; Journal of the Faculty of Fisheries and Animal Husbandry, Hiroshima University, 5 (2) 297-343

Cephalopod genera
Octopodidae